The A509 is a road in Northern Ireland. It travels through County Fermanagh and continues to Cavan and Dublin in the Republic of Ireland as the N3.

The road is a single-carriageway primary route, and forms part of a road corridor from Dublin to Ballyshannon via the N3 route in the Republic of Ireland and the A4 and A46 routes in Northern Ireland.

Route
The A509 commences at a roundabout with the A4 on the outskirts of Enniskillen and follows a south-easterly path parallel to Upper Lough Erne.  The road passes through the villages of Bellaneleck and Mackin, and Derrylin and Teemore at the foot of Slieve Rushen.  The road then skirts past the village of Aghalane, and crosses the Senator George Mitchell Peace Bridge  to link with the N3 onwards to Belturbet, Cavan, Navan and Dublin. 

Roads in Northern Ireland
Roads in County Fermanagh